Asmuni bin Awi is a Malaysian politician served as the Member of the Perak State Executive Council for Islamic Affairs and Education, Industry, Rural and Entrepreneur Development under Menteri Besar  Ahmad Faizal Azumu from 2018 to 2020 and the Member of the Perak State Legislative Assembly for the constituency of Manjoi from 2018 to 2022 and he is a member of the Parti Amanah Negara (AMANAH), a component of Pakatan Harapan (PH) coalition.

Election Results

Honours
  :
  Knight Commander of the Order of the Perak State Crown (DPMP) - Dato' (2019)

References

1967 births
Living people
Malaysian Muslims
Former Malaysian Islamic Party politicians
National Trust Party (Malaysia) politicians
Members of the Perak State Legislative Assembly
Perak state executive councillors
21st-century Malaysian politicians